Halim Haryanto Ho (born 23 September 1976) is an Indonesian former badminton player. He is a former world champion along with his doubles partner Tony Gunawan. Haryanto immigrated to the United States in 2004 to pursue a coaching career. He now resides in San Diego, California, Apex Badminton Academy head coach at SDBCC in San Diego and representing the United States as a badminton player of Team USA.

Personal life
Halim Haryanto Ho was born in Bandung, West Java, Indonesia on 23 September 1976 to Hadimulya Ho and Ana Wun. Haryanto began playing badminton at the age of 8. He graduated from West Java, Indonesia High School in 1994 and joined the Indonesia National Badminton Team in 1995, specializing as a men's doubles player. He is currently married to Jeanny N. Ho, whose father is Hariamanto Kartono, silver medalist at the 1980 IBF World Championships and gold medalist of the All England, Indonesian Open, and Thomas Cup. Together they have two daughters, Gabriella Ho and Graciella Ho. Amongst his hobbies are basketball, swimming, watching James Bond movies, and That '70s Show. He also became a certified massage therapist in 2006. After living in the United States for seven years, Haryanto gained his U.S Citizenship on 19 August 2011.

Career
From 1995 to 2004 Haryanto played for the Indonesia National Badminton Team with various partners before immigrating to the U.S in fall of 2004 to pursue a career as a badminton coach. In those 9 years he played for Indonesia, he enjoyed his most success with fellow countryman and now U.S citizen, Tony Gunawan.  He won his first ever gold medals at the 1998 Malaysia Open and Brunei Open in men's doubles with Tony Gunawan. That year he was also the bronze medalists at the Badminton Asia Championships. In 2001 he won the bi-annual International Badminton Federation World Championship as well as the 2001 All England Championship in men's doubles with Tony Gunawan. They also won the 2001 Singapore Open that year as well. The Singapore Open would be the last international badminton tournament that Haryanto and Gunawan would compete in together under the PBSI.

2002-2004
After the Singapore Open, Haryanto was paired up with Tri Kusharjanto as a part of the Indonesian 2002 Thomas Cup team. They eventually won the 2002, winning their final round match against Malaysia in men's doubles. Near the end 2002 Haryanto began coaching the Indonesian Junior National Badminton team at the SGS Badminton Club in Bandung, West Java, Indonesia. In 2003 Haryanto was paired up with Candra Wijaya, Olympic gold medalist at the 2000 Summer Olympics in men's doubles with Haryanto's previous partner, Tony Gunawan. Their short-lived partnership won them the Copenhagen Masters in 2003 before Haryanto resigned from the Indonesia National Badminton Team and moved to the United States in October 2004.

2004–present
After moving to the United States he procured a job as a badminton coach at Bay Badminton Center in Burlingame, California, while maintaining international presence. In 2005 Haryanto paired up with his former partner, Tony Gunawan (who moved to the United States as well), and won the 2005 Chinese Taipei Open, 2005 Bitburger Open, and the U.S. Open later in 2006. Since then, Haryanto has competed in and several won national level titles including the international level U.S Open as a representative of the United States. Haryanto is also a legendary coach, achieving Level 4 Certified High Performance Coach of USA Badminton, the highest coaching status in the United States. He was also a part of the 2011 United States Pan American Games Badminton Team that competed at the 2011 Pan American Games in Guadalajara, Mexico. He is currently working as Apex Badminton Academy head coach at [San Diego Badminton Center Court – https://www.sdbccinc.com] in San Diego, California.

Achievements

World Championships
Men's doubles

Pan American Games
Men's doubles

Mixed doubles

Asian Games
Men's doubles

Asian Championships 
Men's doubles

BWF Grand Prix 
The BWF Grand Prix has two levels: Grand Prix and Grand Prix Gold. It is a series of badminton tournaments, sanctioned by Badminton World Federation (BWF) since 2007. The World Badminton Grand Prix sanctioned by International Badminton Federation (IBF) since 1983.

Men's doubles

Mixed doubles

 BWF Grand Prix Gold tournament
 BWF & IBF tournament

BWF International Challenge/Series/Satellite
Men's doubles

Mixed doubles

 BWF International Challenge tournament
 BWF International Series/ Satellite tournament

Invitation Tournament
Men's doubles

References

External links 
BWF Player Profile

1976 births
Living people
Sportspeople from Bandung
Indonesian people of Chinese descent
Indonesian male badminton players
Badminton players at the 2002 Asian Games
Asian Games silver medalists for Indonesia
Asian Games bronze medalists for Indonesia
Asian Games medalists in badminton
Medalists at the 2002 Asian Games
Competitors at the 1999 Southeast Asian Games
Southeast Asian Games gold medalists for Indonesia
Southeast Asian Games medalists in badminton
Indonesian emigrants to the United States
People from Milpitas, California
American people of Chinese-Indonesian descent
American male badminton players
Badminton players at the 2011 Pan American Games
Pan American Games silver medalists for the United States
Pan American Games medalists in badminton
Badminton coaches
Medalists at the 2011 Pan American Games
World No. 1 badminton players